MA Hasan is a Bangladeshi physician, human rights activist and genocide researcher. In recognition of his contributions to the literature on the liberation war, he was awarded Bangla Academy Literary Award in 2016.

He is the Convener of War Crimes Fact Finding Committee.

Early life
Hasan was born on 14 March 1950 at Bagerhat District of the then East Pakistan (now Bangladesh).

Awards 
 Bangla Academy Literary Award (2016)

References

1950 births
Recipients of Bangla Academy Award
Living people